Ehsaas is Tarah (Hindi: इस तरह भावनाओं) is a Hindi film directed by Gurman Juggal.  This film stars Kirpal Pandit, Sonia Saran, Dinesh Oman, and includes Sadab Khan and Bindu in supporting roles. This film was released on 16 January 1998.

Plot 
A couple in Mumbai, Harman and Neha, are living prosperously. One day Harman is killed in an "accident."  Then Neha lives with Harman's Sikh brother (who by the way is single), Jassi. Then they fall in love, have sex a lot, get married and have kids. Then Neha, with help of her mother-in-law Uriyaan, figures out that Jassi killed Harman to receive the money that Jassi never received when his father died. Neha tries to kill Jassi but Jassi and his friend Sheldon brutally rape her.  She manages to survive and calls the police, and all including Neha kill Jassi and Sheldon.  In the last scene, Neha and her kids are at home and one kid asks "Can I have money for school?" Then Neha smiles.

Cast 
Kirpal Pandit.... Harman Reddy
Sonia Saran.....Neha Reddy
Dinesh Oman.... Jassi Natarwal
Bindu..... Uriyaan
Sadab Khan.... Sheldon
Steve Sheen.... Police Officer

Music 
Music was done by Gulzar and lyrics were written by Janka Polarat.
 Tera Haq
 Sacha Sacha Pyar Hoga ya
 Is Tarah Ka Pyar
 Tum Kyo Mujhe Har Waqt Satate Raahein
 Let's Beat it Soniye
 Sona Sa Roop hai tera

References 

1998 films
1990s Hindi-language films